Cristina Vega Leandro (born 3 April 1981), also known as Keka, is a Spanish footballer who plays as a midfielder in England's WPL for Keynsham Town. She previously played in the Spanish First Division for Estudiantes Huelva, AD Torrejón and Rayo Vallecano, winning three championships and one national cup and playing the UEFA Champions League with the latter.

She has been a member of the Spain national team.

Keka joined Bristol Academy on 1 August 2013, where she joined compatriots Laura del Río and Natalia Pablos. At Bristol the trio were nicknamed "The Three Amigas".

In January 2015, Keka moved to Keynsham Town to play in the FA Women's Premier League alongside former fellow Rayo Vallecano midfielder, Pilar García. She is currently amongst their leading scorers with six goals from five games.

References

1981 births
Living people
Spanish women's footballers
Women's association football midfielders
Spain women's international footballers
Primera División (women) players
Women's Super League players
FA Women's National League players
Rayo Vallecano Femenino players
Bristol Academy W.F.C. players
Keynsham Town L.F.C. players
AD Torrejón CF Femenino players
Spanish expatriate women's footballers
Spanish expatriate sportspeople in England
Expatriate women's footballers in England